Şenol Akın (born 20 December 1984) is a Turkish former professional footballer who played as a midfielder.

Career
Akın began his career in the amateur leagues of Kocaeli with Körfez Belediyesi Hereke Yıldızspor. In 2002, Akın moved to Izmitspor and made his debut in the TFF Third League. After one season with the club, Akın moved back to the amateur leagues until 2005, when he joined Karabükspor.

On 31 August 2016, he joined Bucaspor on a one-year contract.

References

External links
 

1984 births
People from Gebze
Living people
Turkish footballers
Association football midfielders
Kardemir Karabükspor footballers
Konyaspor footballers
Şanlıurfaspor footballers
Denizlispor footballers
Bucaspor footballers
Süper Lig players
TFF First League players
TFF Second League players